Shri Chhatrapati Shivaji Maharaj College of Engineering (SCSMCOE) is an education institute situated in Nepti, in the city of Ahmednagar district, Maharashtra, India. The institute is affiliated with Savitribai Phule Pune University and managed by Ahmednagar Jilha Maratha Vidya Prasarak Samaj. Admissions take place through the MHT-CET conducted by DTE Maharashtra or Joint Entrance Examination.

The college has departments of mechanical engineering, civil engineering, computer engineering and E&TC engineering.

References

External links

Engineering colleges in Maharashtra
Colleges affiliated to Savitribai Phule Pune University
Education in Ahmednagar district